The Astra Stakes is a Listed American Thoroughbred horse race for fillies and mares that are four years old or older, over a distance of  miles on the turf held annually in January at Santa Anita Park, Arcadia, California.  The event currently carries a purse of $100,000.

History 
The race was inaugurated in 2015 and the event was run over the  miles
distance.

The event is named in honor of the mare Astra who won four Grade I events including the Santa Barbara Handicap twice, which is run at Santa Anita Park.

In 2019 the event was upgraded to a Grade III event.

In 2020 the event started on the Downhill turf course.

In 2023 the American Graded Stakes Committee downgraded the event to Listed.

Records
Speed record: 
  miles – 2:26.61  - Kitten's Point   (2015)

Margins: 
   lengths – Pantsonfire (IRE) (2019)

Most wins by a jockey
 2 – Brice Blanc  (2016, 2020)
 2 – Flavien Prat  (2015, 2019)

Most wins by a trainer
 2 – Richard Baltas  (2017, 2019)

Winners

Notes

References

Ungraded stakes races in the United States
Recurring sporting events established in 2015
2015 establishments in California
Turf races in the United States
Horse races in California
Flat horse races for four-year-old fillies
Santa Anita Park
Long-distance horse races for fillies and mares